Araneus talipedatus the slender green orb-weaver spider is a species of orb weaver in the family Araneidae. Found in many parts of Australia, this species is active in daytime and builds a conventional orb web. The female has a body length of up to 9 mm, males to 7 mm. Long hairs grow  on the legs and pedipalps.

References

talipedatus
Spiders of Australia
Spiders described in 1887